Darin Daraq (also Romanized as Darīn Daraq and Darīndaraq) is a village in Kolah Boz-e Gharbi Rural District, in the Central District of Meyaneh County, East Azerbaijan Province, Iran. At the 2006 census, its population was 701, in 136 families.

References 

Populated places in Meyaneh County